Shir Mahalleh (also Romanized as Shīr Maḩalleh; also known as Shīrīn Maḩalleh) is a village in Machian Rural District, Kelachay District, Rudsar County, Gilan Province, Iran. At the 2006 census, its population was 483, in 141 families.

References 

Populated places in Rudsar County